Chionodes kincaidella is a moth in the family Gelechiidae. It is found in North America, where it has been recorded from south-western Alberta to Texas, New Mexico and California.

The wingspan is 17–21 mm. The forewings are dark fuscous with a broad whitish-ochreous dorsal stripe occupying two-fifths of the wing and extending to the middle of the termen, sometimes posteriorly fuscous-sprinkled, the upper edge forming a variably developed prominence beyond the middle, the ground colour of the wing suffused blackish along the upper edge. There is a suffused whitish-ochreous spot on the costa towards the apex, the apex of the dorsal streak sometimes forming a slight projection opposite this. The hindwings are light grey.

The larvae feed on Atriplex acanthocarpa.

References

Chionodes
Moths described in 1907
Moths of North America